This is a list of dances grouped by ethnicity, country, or region. These dances should also be listed on the general, noncategorized index list of specific dances.

Albania

Dance of Osman Taka
Entarisi ala benziyor
Gusharaveli
Napoloni
Pogonishte
Rugovo (sword dance)
Shota (dance)
Vallja e cobanit

Argentina

Carnavalito
Chacarera
Cueca
Cumbia Villera
Milonga
Tango
Zamba

Armenia

Note: in Armenian "bar"  means "dance".

Berd
Entarisi ala benziyor
Kochari
Shalakho
Tamzara
Temuraga 
Yarkhushta

Austria

Ländler
Schuhplattler
Tyrolienne
Waltz

Azerbaijan

 Abayı
 Agir Karadagi
 Anzali
 Asma kasma
 Choban Regsi
 Halay
 Innaby
 Jangi
 Khanchobany
 
 Shalakho
 Tarakama
 Tello
 Uzundara
 Youz bir

Belarus
Liavonicha (Lyavonikha)
Karahod (Khorovod)
Trasucha (Poĺka-Trasucha)
Kryzhachok

Bolivia

Awki awki
Caporales
Diablada
Kullawada
Llamerada
Morenada
Oruro Diablada
P'aquchi
Siklla
Tobas
Waka waka

Brazil

Brazilian Zouk
Carimbó
Frevo
Lambada
Lundu
Maculelê
Maxixe
Samba
 Samba de Gafieira
Suscia
Xaxado

Brittany

An Dro
Gavotte
Laride
Plinn
Trihori

Bulgaria

Chukano horo
Daychovo horo
Gankino horo
Grancharsko horo
Kopanitsa
Lesnoto
Paidushko horo
Petrunino horo
Pravo
Sadi Moma
Thomai
Tropanka
Yove male mome
Graovsko horo
Trite puti
Dunavsko horo
Elenino horo
Maleshevsko horo
Rukà
Shirto
Kjustendilsko selsko horo
Varnensko horo
Svornato
Jangurica
Chichovo
Ajdarovo
Ispajche

Cambodia

Chhayam
Peacock dance
Ramvong
Robam Neary Chea Chuor

Catalonia
Sardana

China

Dragon dance
Dunhuang dance
Errenzhuan
Lion dance
Yangge
Yingge dance

Colombia
Cumbia
Mapale

Croatia

 Kolo
 Linđo
 Moreška
 Nijemo Kolo

Cuba

Cuban rumba
Danzón
Juego de maní
Mambo
Tumba francesa

Cyprus

Antikristos
Kalamatianos
Sousta
Syrtos
Tatsia

Czech Republic
Furiant
Polka
Redowa
Skočná
Sousedská
Špacírka

Denmark

Gammaldans
Les Lanciers
Polska

Dominican Republic
Bachata
Merengue

Egypt
Baladi
Raqs sharqi
Tahtib
Tanoura

England
Border
Clog
Maypole
Morris dance (longstanding tradition; technically of Continental origins)
Rapper Sword

Ethiopia
Eskista

Finland

Finnish tango
Humppa
Jenkka

Letkajenkka
Polska

France

Bal-musette
Branle
Bourrée
Espringale
Farandole
Gavotte

Java
Loure
Menuet
Passepied
Rigaudon
Valse musette

Galicia
Muiñeira

Georgia

Acharuli
Cilveloy
Davluri
Jeirani
Karachokheli
Kartuli
Kazbeguri
Khanjluri
Khevsuruli
Khorumi
Kintouri
Mtiuluri
Perkhuli
Samaia

Germany
Maypole
Schuhplattler
Waltz
Zwiefacher

Greece

The following is a list with the most notable dances. Names of many Greek dances may be found spelt either ending with -o or with -os. This is due to the fact that the word for "dance" in Greek is a masculine noun, while the dance itself can also be referred to by a neuter adjective used substantively. Thus one may find both "hasapiko" ("the butcher thing") and "hasapikos (horos)" - "the butcher (dance)."

Antikrystos
Antipatitis
Ballos
Diplos horos
Fisounis
Gaitanaki
Ikariotikos
Kalamatianos
Kalymnikos
Kechagiadikos
Kerkiraikos 
Kleistos
Koftos
Lerikos
Maniatikos
Mandilatos
Pilioritikos
Pirgousikos (Chios)
Sianos
Sirtaki
Sperveri
Syrtos 
Trata
Tsakonikos
Tsamikos 
Zeibekiko 
Zonaradiko

Crete

 Angaliastos
 Kanella
 Katsabadianos
 Ntames
 Ntournerakia
 Pentozali
 Pidikhtos
 Sousta
 Trizalis

Macedonia

Gerontikos
Endeka Kozanis
Kastorianos
Kapitan Louka
Leventikos (Florina)
Makedonikos antikristos
Makrinitsa dance
Partalos
Poustseno
Proskinitos
Syrtos Makedonias
Tranos Choros (Kozani)
Zaramo

Guatemala
 Baile de la Conquista
 Punta

Haiti 

 Affranchi
 Gouyad
 Karabinye
 Konbit
 Kontradans
 Kwaze le 8 
 Trese Riban
 Rara

Neo-African/Vodou dances 

 Banda
 Dahomey
 Djouba 
 Ibo
 Kongo
 Mascaron
 Mayi
 Parigol
 Petwo
 Yanvlou

Hungary

Csárdás (Czardas)
Karikázó
Körtánc
Lánytánc
Verbunkos

India

Bhangra
Bhavai dance
Chang dance
Chari Dance
Charkula
Cheraw
Chholiya
Dandiya Raas
Gair dance
Gambhira
Ghoomar
Giddha
Gulikan Theyyam
Jhumar
Kachchhi Ghodi dance
Kalbelia
Karakattam
Kikli
Kummi
Nati
Padayani 
Raibeshe
Sattriya
Thirayattam
Tutsa

Indian classical dance 

 Bhagavata Mela
 Bharatanatyam
 Chhau dance
 Garba
 Gaudiya Nritya
 Kathak
 Kathakali
 Kuchipudi
 Lavani
 Manipuri dance
 Mohiniyattam
 Odissi
 Sattriya
 Yakshagana

Indonesia

Bali 

 Baris
 Cendrawasih
 Condong
 Gambuh
 Janger
 Joged
 Kebyar duduk
 Kecak
 Legong
 Oleg
 Panyembrama
 Pendet
 Sanghyang
 Topeng

Java 

 Bedhaya
 Gandrung
 Kuda lumping
 Wayang wong
 Reog Ponorogo
 Ronggeng
 Serimpi

Sunda 

 Jaipongan
 Merak
 Reog Sunda

Betawi 
 Ronggeng

Aceh 
 Saman
 Likok Pulo

Minang 
 Randai

Palembang 
 Gending Sriwijaya
 Tanggai

Melayu 
 Zapin

Dayak 
 Kancet Papatai

Minahasa 
 Kabasaran
 Poco-poco

Maluku and Papua 
 Cakalele

Iraq
Assyrian folk dance
Hacha'a
Khigga

Iran

Bandari
Choobazi
Lurish dances
Tapurian dance

Ireland

Irish Stepdance
Irish Sean-Nós Dance

Israel

Mayim Mayim
Horah

Italy

Ballu tundu
Calabrian Tarantella
Furlana
Monferrina
Piva
Pizzica
Saltarello
Tarantella

Japan

Angama
Bon Odori
Bugaku 
Butoh
Buyō
Chakkirako
Devil's Sword Dance
Eisa
Kachaashii
Kagura
Kenshibu
Kumi Odori
Noh
Para para
Shirabyōshi
Sōran Bushi
Yosakoi

Kurdistan

 Dilan

Korea

Barachum
Buchaechum
Byeongsin chum
Ganggangsullae
Geommu
Taepyeongmu

Levant 
 Dabke

Macedonia
Crnogorka (dance)
Kopačka
Pušteno
Starotikveško
Teskoto
Tresenica

Madagascar
Hiragasy
Salegy

Mexico

Concheros
Chinelos
Danza de los Viejitos
Danza de los Voladores
Huapango
Jarabe tapatío
Matachines
La Raspa

Middle East

 Arab dance

Mongolia
 Biyelgee

Morocco
 Reggada

Myanmar

Yein

Netherlands

Klompendans

Nicaragua
Hunguhungu
Palo de Mayo

Nigeria
Atilogwu
Etighi
Galala
Okumkpa
Ohafia War Dance

Norway
Bygdedans
Halling
Pols
Rudl
Springar

Oman
Ardah
Fann at-Tanbura
Khaleegy
Razha
Yowlah

Peru

Apu Inka
Ch'unchu
Danza de tijeras
Danzantes de Levanto
Huaconada
Huayno
Marinera
Qhapaq Qulla
Wari
Zamacueca

Philippines

Abaruray
Alcamfor
Alitaptap
Ballangbang
Bendian
Binasuan
Blit B'laan
Cariñosa
Duwawang Malin Awa
Habanera Botoleña
Idudu
Itik-itik
Janggay
Jota and its variations:
Jota Cabangan
Jota Caviteña
Jota Manileña
Jota Moncadeña
Jota Paragua
Jota Quiriño
Kalatong
Kappa Malong-Malong
Kasanduayan
Kataka-taka
Kinaranza
Kuratsa
Lawiswis Kawayan
Leron Leron Sinta
Magkasuyo
Maglalatik
Maglangka
Malagueña
Manang Biday
Pandanggo and its variations:
Pandanggo sa Bulig
Pandanggo sa Ilaw
Pandanggo Oasiwas
Pandanggo Santa Clara
Panderetas
Pangalay
Pantomina
Panurong-Surong
Paru-Parong Bukid
Pasigin
Pasikat na Baso
Pasodoble
Polka and its variations:
Polka sa Nayon
Polka sa Plaza
Polkabal
Putungan
Sagayan
Sarong Banggi
Sayaw sa Bangko
Sayaw Panasahan
Sinakiki
Singkil
Subli
Tiklos
Tinikling
Tutup
Uyaoy
Zamboanga
Zamboanga

Poland

Krakowiak
Kujawiak
Mazurka (Mazur)
Oberek
Polonaise
Trojak
Varsovienne

Portugal
Chula
Corridinho
Malhão
Vira

Provence
Farandole
Tambourin

Puerto Rico
Bomba
Danza
Plena

Punjab (India/Pakistan)

Female dances
Giddha
Kikli
Sammi

Male dances
 Ho Jamalo
Bhangra
Dhumal
Luddi

Qatar
 Al Moradah
 Ardah
 Khaleegy

Romani dance

Romania

Învârtita
Căluș
Hora
Hora boierească
Feciorescul 
Sorocul
Jiana
Alunelul
Perinița
Țarina
Brașoveanca
Sârba
Palatca
Bătuta din Țara Moților
Brâul
Ciuleandra

Russia

A my proso seyali
Barynya
Beryozka
Bychok
Curve tanok
Gusachok
Kamarinskaya
Kapustka
Khorovod
Metelytsia
Podushechka
Squat dance
Troika
Tropak
Vo luzyakh
Yablochko
Zhuravel

Rwanda 

 Intore
 Umushagiriro

Saudi Arabia
Ardah
Mizmar

Scandinavia

Fannike (Danish)
Halling (Norwegian)
Hambo (Swedish)
Humppa (Finnish)
Jenkka (Finnish)
Letkajenkka (Finnish)
Polska (Nordic countries)
Snoa (Swedish)
Springar (Norwegian)
Sønderhoning (Danish)
Tanhu (Finnish)

Scotland

Clutha
Dashing White Sergeant
Dirk dance
Duke of Perth
Earl of Erroll
Écossaise
Gay Gordons 
Highland Fling
Jig
Pas de Basques and Highcuts
Reel
Reel of the 51st Highlanders
Roger de Coverley
Seann Triubhas
Strathspey
Strip the willow
Wilt Thou Go to the Barracks, Johnny?
Witches reel

Serbia

Kolo
Oro (eagle dance)

Slovakia
 Odzemek

Somalia
Dhaanto
Niiko

South Africa
Indlamu
Gumboot dance
Sokkie
Toyi-toyi
Volkspele
Xibelani

Spain

Aragonaise
Ball dels Cossiers
Cachucha
Corrido
Fandango
Flamenco
Jota
Muiñeira
Sardana
Seguidilla
Sevillanas
Zambra
Zapateado

Sri Lanka

 Kandyan dance

Sweden
 Hambo
 Slängpolska
 Snoa

Tahiti
 'Aparima
 Hivinau
 'ote'a
 Pa'o'a
 Tamure
 'upa'upa

Thailand

 Romvong

Trinidad and Tobago 
 Calypso

Turkey

Adiyaman
Agir halay
Duz halay
Agir Malatya
Deriko
Galuc
Ucayak
Agir hava
Dik hava
Hasandagli
Lorke
Pekmezo
Dokuzlu
Dokuzokkali
Tirpano
Kudaro halayi
Agir Govcuk
Tirge

Artvin
Acara (Ajaria)
Artvin Bari
Ata Bari
Bar
Cilveloy
Deli Horon
Done
Hancer Bari
Horon
Kiz Horonu
Koceri
Koroglu Oyunu
Ondort
Sari Cicek
Tamara
Tamzara
Temuraga

Aydin
Aydın Zeybegi
Harmandalı Zeybegi
Eski Tavas Zeybegi
Ortaklar Zeybegi

Bingöl
El cirpma (capukay)
Govent (Bingol Halayi)
Meyrom
Horani
Caca (Karayilan)
Cezayir havasi

Burdur
Avsar Beyleri
Serenler
Teke Zortlatmasi
Karinom
Keziban Yenge
Tek Zeybek
Teke zortlatmasi
Otme Gugut Otme
AI Yazma
Dimi Dimi
Kabardic
Yayla Yollari
Sari Zeybek

Edirne
Sulumanaga
Kasap
Eski Kasap
Balkan Gaydasi
Pomak Gaydasi
Zigos
Arzuyla Kanber
Sirto
Kazibem

Igdir
Sari Gelin

Izmir
 Kara Gozlu Hasanim (Syrtos)
  Izmir kasap havasi (Hasapiko)

Kars
Tarakama

Trabzon
Karsilama
Kolbastı

Ukraine

Arkan
Bereznianka
Bondar
Buryma
Bychky
Chabarashky
Chumak
Holubka
Hopak
Hopak-Kolom
Hutsulka
Khorovod
Kolomyjka
Kozachok
Metelytsia
Perepilka
Pleskach
Pryvit
Roman
Rybka
Sanzharivka
Shevchyky
Shumka
Tropak
Tropotianka
Uvyvanets
Vesnianky
Zhuravel

United Arab Emirates
Ardah
Khaleegy
Yowlah

United States

Clogging
Contra dance
Line
Salty Dog Rag
Square dance:
Modern western square dance
Tap dance
Swing dance
Traditional square dance
Yankee Dutch crossing

California
Balboa

Georgia
Square dance

Hawaii
Hula

Louisiana
Cajun:
Cajun Jig, also known as Cajun One Step
Cajun Two Step
Cajun Jitterbug
Cajun Waltz
Zydeco

New York
Breakdancing
Lindy Hop
Collegiate Shag (Double-Rhythm Shag)
Salsa

North Carolina
Shag (Single-Rhythm Shag)
Carolina Shag

South Carolina
The Big Apple
Carolina shag
the Charleston (dance)

Texas
Cowboy
Cotton-Eyed Joe
Line dance
Western swing (Texas Swing, Country Swing, Aggie Swing)
Whip

Virginia
Virginia Reel

Venezuela

Joropo
Tambor

Vietnam

Lion dance

Wales
Hornpipe

Yemen
 North Yemen: Bara'a dance
 South Yemen: Sharh dance

See also
Index of dance articles
List of dances
Outline of dance, a list of general dance topics

External links
 International Folk Dance
 DIFFERENT TYPES OF DANCES PERFORMED ON DIFFERENT OCCASIONS

 
Folk dances
Dances